The Medal "In Commemoration of the 1500th Anniversary of Kyiv" was a state commemorative medal of the Soviet Union established by decree of the Presidium of the Supreme Soviet of the USSR on May 10, 1982 to commemorate the 1500th anniversary of the Hero City of Kyiv.

Medal Statute 
The Medal "In Commemoration of the 1500th Anniversary of Kyiv" was awarded to workers, to specialists of the national economy, to workers of science and culture, of government agencies and community organizations, to military personnel, to retirees and other individuals who contributed to the economic, social and cultural development of the city, if residents of Kyiv or its suburbs for at least 10 years; to participants in the defence of Kyiv during the Great Patriotic War, to veterans awarded the medal "For Defence of Kyiv", to partisans and fighters of the underground who fought in Kyiv and its vicinity, for participation in the liberation of the city as part of the Soviet Armed Forces, regardless of where they might now live.

The Medal "In Commemoration of the 1500th Anniversary of Kyiv" was awarded by the Executive Committee of the Kyiv City Council on behalf of the Presidium of the Supreme Soviet of the USSR.

The medal was worn on the left side of the chest and in the presence of other medals of the Soviet Union, was located immediately after the Medal "In Commemoration of the 250th Anniversary of Leningrad".  If worn in the presence of medals and Orders of the Russian Federation, the latter have precedence.

Medal Description 
The Medal "In Commemoration of the 1500th Anniversary of Kyiv" was a 32mm in diameter circular brass medal.  The obverse bears the relief image of deployed banners and divergent beams as a background to the Kyiv monument in honour of the Great October Socialist Revolution. Along the upper circumference of the medal, the inscription: "In Commemoration of the 1500 Anniversary of Kyiv".  On the reverse, in the upper part is an image of a "Gold Star" of Hero of the Soviet Union, just below it the inscription in two lines "GLORY TO THE HERO-CITY!".  In the lower part, the image of the building of the Supreme Soviet of the Ukrainian SSR, to its right, the image of the Sophia Museum, a cultural monument of the eleventh century.

The medal is secured to a standard Russian pentagonal mount by a ring through the medal suspension loop. The mount is covered by a 24mm wide green silk moiré ribbon with a red 2mm left edge stripe, a blue 2mm right edge stripe and a central 8mm red stripe flanked by two 0,5mm wide gold edge stripes on each side spaced 1mm apart.

Recipients (partial list) 
The individuals listed below were recipients of the Medal "In Commemoration of the 1500th Anniversary of Kyiv".

 Alexander Ivanovich Pokryshkin
 Ivan Khristoforovich Bagramyan
 Georgy Filippovich Baydukov
 Boris Evseyevich Chertok
 Boris Alexandrovich Rybakov
 Leonid Ilyich Brezhnev
 Mikhail Sergeyevich Gorbachev
 Ilya Grigoryevich Starinov
 Ivan Fedorovich Ladyga
 Iosif Davydovich Kobzon
 Vitaly Ivanovich Popkov

References

See also 
Battle of Kyiv (1941)
Battle of Kyiv (1943)
City of Kyiv
Awards and decorations of the Soviet Union

1500th anniversary of Kyiv
1982 establishments in the Soviet Union
Awards established in 1982
Civil awards and decorations of the Soviet Union
History of Kyiv